Arno Franzen (14 January 1916 – 21 May 1976) was a Brazilian rower. He competed in the men's eight event at the 1936 Summer Olympics.

References

External links
 

1916 births
1976 deaths
Brazilian male rowers
Olympic rowers of Brazil
Rowers at the 1936 Summer Olympics
Sportspeople from Rio Grande do Sul